The Journal of Information & Knowledge Management was founded in 2002 and is a peer-reviewed academic journal published quarterly by World Scientific. It publishes articles covering information processing and knowledge management, including: tools, techniques and technologies; knowledge creation and sharing; as well as best practices, policies and guidelines.

Abstracting and indexing 
The journal is abstracted and indexed in:

 io-port.net
 Inspec

Editorial Board

External links 
 JIKM Journal Website

Publications established in 2002
Knowledge management journals
World Scientific academic journals
English-language journals
2002 establishments in Singapore